Frederick Francis Houser (November 14, 1904 – December 25, 1989) was an American politician and judge. A member of the Republican Party, he served as 34th Lieutenant Governor of California under Governor Earl Warren from 1943 to 1947.

Early years
Houser was born in Los Angeles, California on November 14, 1904, the son of California Court of Appeals Justice Frederick W. Houser and Sara Wilde, both of whom were active participants in the early years of what is now the USC Gould School of Law.  Houser was raised in Alhambra, California, and graduated from the University of Southern California at Los Angeles in 1926. He taught government at Harvard University while attending Harvard Law School from 1926 to 1929, and he graduated with an LL.B.  Houser was admitted to the bar in 1930, and practiced law until 1946.  Houser was UCLA's student body president from 1925 to 1926, served as president of the UCLA alumni association 1933–1935, and won the school's Edward A. Dickson Alumnus of the Year Award in 1948.

Career
From 1926 to 1940, Houser was a member of the Los Angeles County Republican Central Committee.  From 1930 to 1940, he served on the California Republican State Central Committee.  He served in the California State Assembly from 1931 to 1933 and again from 1939 to 1943.  Houser was an unsuccessful Republican candidate for the United States House of Representatives in 1932, 1934, and 1936.

In 1942, Houser was elected lieutenant governor.  He served until 1947, and was an unsuccessful candidate for the United States Senate in 1944, losing narrowly to incumbent Sheridan Downey.

Judge
After leaving the lieutenant governor's office, Houser was appointed as a judge of the California Superior Court.  He served from 1947 until retiring in 1966.

Retirement and death
In retirement, Houser was a resident of Laguna Beach, California.  He died in Laguna Beach on December 25, 1989.

Family
In 1925, Houser married Dorothy Eleanor Bodinus, a fellow UCLA student.  She died in 1996, and they had no children.

Notes

Sources

Internet

Newspapers

External links

Join California Frederick F. Houser

1904 births
1989 deaths
California state court judges
Republican Party members of the California State Assembly
University of California, Los Angeles alumni
Harvard University faculty
Lieutenant Governors of California
People from Alhambra, California
20th-century American lawyers
20th-century American judges
Harvard Law School alumni
20th-century American politicians